Manhattan Vocational and Technical High School is a former high school located in New York City.   It closed in the year 1984.  It was located on east 96th street.  In 1968 it was pad locked as a result of a teachers strike.

Notable alumni
Ken Owens, basketball player and coach
Rick Rasmussen, professional surfer

See also
 List of high schools in New York City

References

Defunct high schools in Manhattan
Educational institutions in the United States with year of establishment missing
Former school buildings in the United States
Public high schools in Manhattan
Educational institutions disestablished in 1984
1984 disestablishments in New York (state)